The 2018 TCR UK Touring Car Championship was the first season of the TCR UK Touring Car Championship, promoted by the British Racing and Sports Car Club. The season began on 1 April at Silverstone Circuit and ended on 14 October at Donington Park. The Driver's Champion was Daniel Lloyd, and the Team Champions were WestCoast Racing.

Teams and drivers

Calendar and results
The 2018 schedule consisted of seven race weekends with two races each weekend, with the grid for Race 1 being determined by a traditional qualifying session. The grid for Race 2 will be made up by reversing the top 10 from the second fastest qualifying lap. The calendar was announced on 13 September 2017.

Championship standings

Drivers' championship

Teams' Championship

References

External links
 
 

UK
2018 in British motorsport